Sphingomonas phyllosphaerae is a species of bacteria. It was first isolated from the phyllosphere of a leguminous tree, Acacia caven, in central Argentina. It is Gram-negative, strictly aerobic, rod-shaped and motile. Its type strain is FA2(T) (=LMG 21958(T)=CECT 5832(T)).

References

External links

Type strain of Sphingomonas phyllosphaerae at BacDive -  the Bacterial Diversity Metadatabase

phyllosphaerae
Bacteria described in 2004